Maloof is a Lebanese family that comes from Kings and has been traced back to 37AD.  It may refer to:

 Maloof (Arabic:معلوف ), the family surname written as Maalouf (with alternate spellings: Maloof, Malouf, Maluf; Malluf, Malouff)
 Sam Maloof (1916–2009), American furniture craftsman
 Maloof family, American family owning multiple businesses, hotels, casinos, and the NBA/WNBA franchises of the Sacramento Kings and Sacramento Monarchs
 George J. Maloof, Sr. (1925–1980), patriarch of the Maloof family
 George J. Maloof, Jr. (b. 1964), billionaire son of George J. Maloof, Sr.
 Maloof Productions, entertainment company owned by the family

See also
Maalouf
Malouf (disambiguation)